The 2020 FIFA Club World Cup final was the final match of the 2020 FIFA Club World Cup, an international club football tournament hosted by Qatar. It was the 17th final of the FIFA Club World Cup, a FIFA-organised tournament between the club champions from each of the six continental confederations, as well as the host nation's league champions.

The final was contested by German club Bayern Munich, representing UEFA as the reigning champions of the UEFA Champions League, and Mexican club UANL, representing CONCACAF as the reigning champions of the CONCACAF Champions League. It was the first time a team from the CONCACAF region played in the final.

The match was played at the Education City Stadium in Al Rayyan on 11 February 2021. The final was originally scheduled to be played in December 2020, but was moved to February due to the impact of the COVID-19 pandemic on the scheduling of the various continental club competitions.

Bayern Munich won the match 1–0 for their second FIFA Club World Cup title and fourth title at the global level. With the win, Bayern became the second European team to complete a sextuple (six trophies in a year) after Barcelona in 2009; they had won a continental treble in the previous season, along with their domestic and continental super cups in the 2020–21 campaign.

Teams

Venue
The Education City Stadium in Al Rayyan, Qatar was announced as the final venue on 23 December 2020. The venue finished construction and opened in 2020, and will host matches at the 2022 FIFA World Cup. Originally, the stadium was to host the second semi-final, third place play-off and final of the 2019 FIFA Club World Cup, but the matches were moved to the Khalifa International Stadium after the opening of the Education City Stadium was postponed.

Background
Bayern Munich reached their second Club World Cup Final in two tournament appearances, having done so in 2013, which they won against Raja Casablanca. Overall, it was their fourth club world championship final, having won their Intercontinental Cup in 1976 and 2001. Bayern Munich were seeking their sixth title in a year, having won the Bundesliga, DFB-Pokal and UEFA Champions League in the 2019–20 season, followed by the UEFA Super Cup and DFL-Supercup so far in the 2020–21 campaign. Therefore, a victory would see become the second team to win a sextuple, consisting of a continental treble (domestic league, domestic cup and continental competition), followed by the subsequent domestic and continental super cups and FIFA Club World Cup in the following season. This feat had only previously been achieved by Barcelona in 2009 (end of the 2008–09 season and start of the 2009–10 season).

UANL became the first side from CONCACAF to reach the final of the Club World Cup. They were making their debut appearance in the competition, having qualified by winning their first CONCACAF Champions League title in 2020.

Route to the final

Match

Summary
In the 59th minute, Benjamin Pavard got the only goal of the game when he shot into an empty net from six yards out after the ball came to him when Robert Lewandowski challenged for a ball in the air with UANL goalkeeper Nahuel Guzmán. The goal was reviewed by VAR for an offside before eventually being awarded.

Details

Statistics

Notes

References

External links
 

Final
2020
FC Bayern Munich matches
Tigres UANL matches
2020–21 in German football
2020–21 in Mexican football
2020–21 in Qatari football
Sports competitions in Doha
21st century in Doha
FIFA Club World Cup Final, 2020
Sport in Al Rayyan